Rubem Azevedo Alves (15 September 1933 – 19 July 2014) was a Brazilian theologian, philosopher, educator, writer and psychoanalyst. Alves was one of the founders of Latin American liberation theology.

Life
Alves was born on 15 September 1933, in Boa Esperança, Minas Gerais, Brazil. He obtained his Bachelor of Theology (BTh) degree at the  Presbyterian Seminary in Campinas, Brazil, in 1957. He went on to obtain a Master of Theology (ThM) from the Union Theological Seminary in New York City, United States, in 1964. After completing this degree, Alves returned to Brazil amidst a US-sponsored military coup against the democratically elected Brazilian government. At the time, the new military regime was attempting to purge Brazil of communist sympathizers. The Presbyterian Church of Brazil provided the new government with the names of six intellectuals to serve as scapegoats and to avert persecution themselves. Immediately upon his return to Brazil, Alves went into hiding. More than forty accusations were made against Alves and others, including claims that they taught that Jesus was sexually involved with a prostitute, celebrated when their children denounced Americans, and were funded by the Soviet Union. Alves reports that these accusations were ineffective, saying, "the positive side of the document was that it was so virulent, that not even the most obtuse could believe that we were guilty of so many crimes." Alves continued to elude government authorities. Within two months of his arrival in Brazil, he returned to the United States covertly with assistance from Brazilian Freemasons and the Presbyterian Church in the United States, which secured an invitation from Princeton Theological Seminary for him to commence doctoral studies there.

Alves did not enjoy his studies at Princeton. He sorely missed his homeland, and felt constrained by the requirements of the doctoral program. Although he ultimately wrote his dissertation according to the requirements of his professors, Alves was not pleased with it, saying, "I wrote uglily, without smiles or poetry, for there was no other alternative: a Brazilian student, underdeveloped, in a foreign institution, must indeed submit himself, if he wants to pass." He completed his doctoral dissertation, Toward a Theology of Liberation, in 1968, and received "the lowest possible grade" needed to receive his doctorate (PhD) at Princeton in 1968.

Alves later critiqued the direction some writers took Latin American liberation theology, saying "it has little to say about the personal dimension of life. If a father or mother comes with their dead child, it's no consolation to say, 'In the future just society there will be no more deaths of this kind.' This brings no comfort!" He also described liberation theology as "absolutely essential", describing his own version of liberation theology with these words: "The origin of my liberation theology is an erotic exuberance for life. We need to struggle to restore its erotic exuberance, to share this with the whole world."

Academic career
 Trained as a psychoanalyst through the Brazilian Association of Psychoanalysis of São Paulo.
 Assistant Professor of Social Philosophy, Faculty of Philosophy, Sciences and Letters of Rio Claro (1969).
 Assistant Professor of Philosophy, State University of Campinas (UNICAMP) (1974). He was promoted to professor (1979) and associate professor (1980), both at the Faculty of Education, UNICAMP.

Career as writer
Besides his activities as a university professor and researcher, Alves was a prolific writer of books and articles in journals and newspapers on education, psychology and life in general. From 1986 he was a regular columnist in Correio Popular, the main newspaper in his hometown, Campinas, in São Paulo state. He published more than 40 books, several of which have been translated into German, French, English, Italian, Spanish and Romanian.

During his career he collaborated with notable personalities, including Peter Maurin, Dorothy Day, and Paulo Freire.

His book, The Poet, The Warrior, The Prophet, is an important text in the field of theopoetics.

During the last years of his life, Alves wrote several children's books. Alves died on 19 July 2014, in Campinas, Brazil.

Legacy
Alves has been described as an "unsung hero", and is often omitted from brief descriptions of liberation theology.

Books

International
 
  246 pages. Revised version of his doctorate thesis, originally titled Towards a Theology of Liberation.
 
 
 
  246 pages.
 
  207 pages.
  231 pages.
  269 pages.
  192 pages.
 
  215 pages.
  79 pages.
  85 pages.
  143 pages.
  144 pages.
  148 pages.
  203 pages.
  199 pages.
  191 pages.
  95 pages.
  182 pages. (translation of As Melhores Crônicas de Rubem Alves)
  212 pages. (translation of Retorno e Terno)
  205 pages. (translation of Concerto para Corpo e Alma)

In Portuguese
  120 pages.
  199 pages.
  169 pages.
  190 pages.
  133 pages.
  290 pages.
  172 pages.
  73 pages.
  213 pages.
  119 pages.
  80 pages.
  87 pages.
  108 pages.
  119 pages.
  146 pages.
  109 pages.
  143 pages.
  100 pages.
  169 pages.
  95 pages.
  103 pages.
  224 pages.
  164 pages.
  111 pages.
  109 pages.
  128 pages.
  103 pages.
  160 pages.
 
  148 pages.
  214 pages.
  261 pages.

References

External links
 .
 .
 .
 
 .

1933 births
2014 deaths
Brazilian philosophers
Brazilian Christian theologians
Calvinist and Reformed philosophers
Brazilian Presbyterians
Brazilian educators
People from Campinas
Academic staff of the State University of Campinas
People from Minas Gerais
Union Theological Seminary (New York City) alumni
Princeton Theological Seminary alumni
Brazilian male novelists
Brazilian columnists
Liberation theologians
20th-century Brazilian novelists
20th-century Brazilian male writers
20th-century Brazilian educators
21st-century Brazilian educators
21st-century Brazilian male writers